The Regional District of East Kootenay  (RDEK) is a regional district in the Canadian province of British Columbia, Canada. In the 2016 census, the population was 60,439. The regional district offices are in Cranbrook, the largest community in the region. Other important population centres include the cities of Kimberley and Fernie, and the district municipality of Invermere and Sparwood. Despite its name, the regional district does not include all of the region known as the East Kootenay, which includes the Creston Valley and the east shore of Kootenay Lake.

Geography

The regional district's dominant landform is the Rocky Mountain Trench, which is flanked by the Purcell Mountains and Rocky Mountains on the east and west, and includes the Columbia Valley region, the southern half of which is in the regional district (its northern half is in the Columbia-Shuswap Regional District).  Another distinct area within the regional district is the Elk Valley in the southern Rockies, which is the entrance to the Crowsnest Pass and an important coal-mining region.  Other than the Columbia and Kootenay Rivers, whose valleys form the bottomlands of the Rocky Mountain Trench, also included in the regional district are the northernmost parts of the basins of the Flathead, Moyie and Yahk Rivers (the Moyie and Yahk are tributaries of the Kootenay, entering it in the United States, and the Flathead is a tributary of the Clark Fork in Montana).

Demographics 

Note: Totals greater than 100% due to multiple origin responses.

Municipalities

Health care
The largest hospital in the region is the East Kootenay Regional Hospital in Cranbrook. There are also hospitals in Creston (Creston Valley Hospital), Fernie (Elk Valley Hospital), Invermere (Invermere & District Hospital), and Golden (Golden & District Hospital). Primary health centers are present in Sparwood and Elkford.

First Nations
The First Nations people who live in the East Kootenay are from the Ktunaxa Nation. There are currently four bands Columbia Lake First Nation near Windermere, Lower Kootenay First Nation near Creston, St. Mary's First Nation near Cranbrook, and Tobacco Plains First Nation near Grasmere.

See also
Findlay Creek

Notes

References

 Census Profile, 2016 Census, East Kootenay

External links

 
 

 
East Kootenay